Whaler is a surname. Notable people with the surname include:

 Kathryn Whaler (born 1956), British professor
 Sean Whaler (born 2000), English footballer

See also
 Whale (surname)
 Whalen
 Whaley (surname)